Sé Nova is a former civil parish in the municipality of Coimbra, Portugal. In 2013, the parish merged into the new parish Coimbra (Sé Nova, Santa Cruz, Almedina e São Bartolomeu). It has a population of 8,295 inhabitants and a total area of 1.43 km2.

Monuments
Colégio de São Jerónimo (college)
Aqueduto de São Sebastião (aqueduct)
Igreja de Santa Ana ou Convento de Santa Ana (convent)
Portal do Colégio de São Tomás (college)
Sé Nova de Coimbra or Colégio dos Jesuítas or Igreja das Onze Mil Virgens (cathedral)
Igreja de São Salvador (Sé Nova) (church)
Paço Episcopal de Coimbra or Museu Nacional de Machado de Castro (museum)
Paços da Universidade or Paços das Escolas (part of the university)
Parque de Santa Cruz or Jardim da Sereia (a large park/Garden of the Mermeid)
Jardim Botânico (botanical garden) of Coimbra University

References

Former parishes of Coimbra